Ifianyong Obot is a village in Uruan local government area of Akwa Ibom state in Nigeria.

Villages in Akwa Ibom